Manuel Marques may refer to:

Manuel Marques (Guge) (16th century - 1640s), a Portuguese missionary in India and Guge (Tibet)
Manuel Marques (Guiana), Head of French Guiana (1809) during Portuguese Occupation
Manuel Soares Marques (1917), Portuguese Association footballer